The women's 1500 metre freestyle competition at the 2014 South American Games took place on March 10 at the Estadio Nacional.  The last champion was Kristel Köbrich of Chile.

This event was a timed-final where each swimmer swam just once. The top 8 seeded swimmers swam in the evening, and the remaining swimmers swam in the morning session.

Records
Prior to this competition, the existing world and Pan Pacific records were as follows:

Results
All times are in minutes and seconds.

The first round was held on March 10, at 11:36, and the final was held on March 10, at 19:33.

References

Swimming at the 2014 South American Games